The 2018–19 Cornell Big Red women's basketball team represents Cornell University during the 2018–19 NCAA Division I women's basketball season. The Big Red, led by seventeenth year head coach Dayna Smith, play their home games at Newman Arena and are members of the Ivy League. They finished the season at 12–14, 6–8 to finish in a 3-way tie for fourth place. Due to a tie breaker with to Yale and Dartmouth earns the 4th seed in Ivy League women's tournament which they lost to Princeton in semifinals.

Roster

Schedule

|-
!colspan=9 style=| Non-conference regular season

|-
!colspan=9 style=| Ivy League regular season

|-
!colspan=8 style=| Ivy League Tournament

See also
 2018–19 Cornell Big Red men's basketball team

References

Cornell Big Red women's basketball seasons
Cornell
Cornell Big Red women's
Cornell Big Red women's